Shiv Sampati Ram is an Indian politician. He was elected to the Lok Sabha the lower house of Indian Parliament from Robertsganj in Uttar Pradesh as a member of the Janata Party.

References

External links
Official biographical sketch in Parliament of India website 

India MPs 1977–1979
Lok Sabha members from Uttar Pradesh
Possibly living people
Year of birth missing